Taygetis thamyra, the Andromeda satyr, is a species of butterfly in the family Nymphalidae. It is found in Suriname, Colombia, Brazil (Amazonas, Rio de Janeiro, Rondônia) and the Guyanas.

References

Butterflies described in 1779
Euptychiina
Fauna of Brazil
Nymphalidae of South America